Jake Manley (born August 23, 1991) is a Canadian actor, best known for his roles as Jack Morton in the Netflix series The Order, Brad in the NBC series Heroes Reborn, Fisher Webb in the CW series iZombie, Shane in A Dog’s Journey (2019), George Waller in Brotherhood (2019), Dean Taylor in Infamous (2020) and York in Holidate (2020).

Early life

Manley was born in Oakville, Ontario. During his formative years, he attended River Oaks Public School where he amazed his class mates with his skateboarding tricks and later graduated from Holy Trinity Catholic Secondary School.

Career

In 2012, Manley made his acting debut in the CW drama series, Beauty & the Beast. Following on from his first role, Manley won other roles on a variety of TV shows including Cracked, Heroes Reborn, iZombie and American Gods.

In 2017, it was reported that Manley would star alongside Gage Munroe and Dylan Everett in the film Brotherhood.

On April 17, 2018, it was announced by Deadline that Manley would star in a main role as Jack Morton in the Netflix horror-drama series, The Order.

In 2019, Manley starred as Willie West in Roland Emmerich's war film Midway.

In May 2019, Manley was cast in the Netflix romantic comedy Holidate. In the same month, it was announced that Manley would star alongside Bella Thorne in the heist thriller film Infamous. The film was released on June 12, 2020.

Personal life 

Manley began dating actress Jocelyn Hudon in 2015. The couple got engaged on August 26, 2020. Currently, they reside in Los Angeles, California.

Filmography

Film

Television

References

External links
 

1991 births
Living people
Canadian male television actors
Canadian male film actors
21st-century Canadian male actors